Sri Krishna Rukmini Satyabhama is a 1971 Kannada-language Hindu mythological film written and directed by K. S. L. Swamy. The film stars Rajkumar, B. Saroja Devi, Aarathi  and Bharathi. The film was released under Raghunandan Movies banner and the music was composed by R. Sudarsanam.

Cast 

 Rajkumar as Lord Krishna
 B. Saroja Devi as Rukmini
 Bharathi as Satyabhama
 Aarathi as Jambhavathi
 Srinath as Narada
 Dwarakish as Makarañda
 Lokanath as Ugrasena
 Thoogudeepa Srinivas as Rukmi
 Dinesh as Shishupala
 K. S. Ashwath as Satrajitha
 Arun Kumar
 B. Jaya as Kamala
 Sampath as Bhishmaka

Soundtrack 
The music of the film was composed by R. Sudarsanam and lyrics for the soundtrack written by Chi. Udaya Shankar and Chi. Sadashivaiah.

Track list

See also
 Kannada films of 1971

References

External links 
 

1971 films
1970s Kannada-language films
Indian black-and-white films
Hindu mythological films
Films based on the Mahabharata
Films scored by R. Sudarsanam
Films directed by K. S. L. Swamy